East Stirlingshire Football Club is a Scottish association football club from Falkirk. The club was formed in 1881, with its origins traced to the previous year when a local cricket club from Bainsford formed a footballing section under the name Britannia. After spending their first ten seasons solely participating in cup tournaments and friendlies, East Stirlingshire competed in regional leagues between 1891 and 1899, including the Central Football Combination and the Midland Football League. In 1900, the club was elected to the second-tier of Scotland's main national league competition – the Scottish Football League. The club remained in the Scottish Football League Division Two until 1914–15, when the league was suspended due to the outbreak of World War I. The league was restarted in 1921–22 and after a solitary season in the third-tier in 1923–24, East Stirlingshire remained in the second-tier until 1932–33 when the club was promoted to the top-tier for the first time but were relegated after one season. Between 1939 and 1955, the club spent only three seasons in the Scottish Football League after being refused entry to its second-tier after the end of World War II and did not join again until the 1955–56 when the number of teams in the league was expanded. The club remained in the Scottish Football League until the 2012–13 season, when it merged with the Scottish Premier League to create a new governing body called the Scottish Professional Football League.

East Stirlingshire's first team record against each club it has faced in the Scottish Football League and Scottish Professional Football League is listed below. East Stirlingshire's first Scottish Football League match was against Airdrieonians in 1900, and they met their 72nd and most recent different league opponent, Annan Athletic, for the first time in the 2008–09 season. The team East Stirlingshire has played the most in league competitions is Albion Rovers from Coatbridge, whom they met for the first time in the 1903–04 season. As well as the most matches, East Stirlingshire has won, drawn and lost more league games against Albion Rovers than any other opponent with 65 wins, 40 draws and 95 losses from 200 encounters.

Key
The table includes results of matches played by East Stirlingshire in the Scottish Football League and the Scottish Professional Football League. Matches from regional leagues and various wartime competitions are excluded.
The name used for each opponent is the name they had when East Stirlingshire most recently played a league match against them. Results against each opponent include results against that club under any former name. For example, results against Dundee United include matches played against Dundee Hibernian (1909–1923).
The columns headed "First" and "Last" contain the first and most recent seasons in which East Stirlingshire played league matches against each opponent.
P = matches played; W = matches won; D = matches drawn; L = matches lost; Win% = percentage of total matches won
  Clubs with this background and symbol in the "Opponent" column are East Stirlingshire's divisional rivals in the current season.
  Clubs with this background and symbol in the "Opponent" column are defunct.

All-time league record
Statistics correct up to match played on 8 March 2014 (East Stirlingshire 1–0 Stirling Albion).

Footnotes
A.  Includes record against Dundee Hibernian
B.  Includes record against Morton
C.  Includes record against Caledonian Thistle
D.  Includes record against Meadowbank Thistle

References
General

Specific

League record by opponent
East Stirlingshire
East Stirlingshire F.C.